The Sorcerer is a home computer system released in 1978 by the video game company Exidy, later under their Exidy Systems subsidiary. Based on the Zilog Z80 and the general layout of the emerging S-100 standard, the Sorcerer was comparatively advanced when released, especially when compared to the contemporary more commercially successful Commodore PET and TRS-80. The basic design was proposed by Paul Terrell, formerly of the Byte Shop, a pioneering computer store.

Lacking strong support from its parent company, who were focused on the successful arcade game market, the Sorcerer was sold primarily through international distributors and technology licensing agreements. Distribution agreements with Dick Smith Electronics in Australia and Liveport in the UK as well as Compudata which included a manufacturing license to build, market and distribute the Tulip line of computers in Europe. The system remains relatively unknown outside these markets.

The Exidy Data Systems division was sold to a Wall Street firm, Biotech, in 1983.

History

Origins 
Paul Terrell entered the computer industry by starting the first personal computer store, the Byte Shop, in 1975. By 1977, the store had grown into a chain of 58 stores, and Terrell sold the chain to John Peers of Logical Machine Corporation.

With free time on his hands, Terrell started looking for new ventures. He wanted a consumer computer that was user-friendly beyond anything currently in the marketplace. At the time, the Commodore PET and Tandy TRS-80 offered the out-of-the-box experience he considered essential, yet required a costly computer monitor in spite of their inadequate graphics. The Apple II had superior graphics and color, but required some user assembly before being operational.

Terrell's objective was a machine offering the best of both worlds. Looking for a suitable name, he noted "Computers are like magic to people, so let's give them computer magic with the Sorcerer computer."

Exidy
Terrell was friends with H.R. "Pete" Kauffman and Howell Ivy of Exidy, a successful arcade game manufacturer. Terrell noted "Their graphic designs with a computer were so good they would take quarters out of my pocket." Howell, VP of Engineering, was a computer enthusiast and was interested in Terrell's concept. The wish list of design improvements over the existing designs went like this:

 A keyboard computer that could plug into a television set like the Apple II and TRS-80 but also plug into a computer monitor to display high resolution graphics.
 An easily programmable graphics character set like the Commodore PET, so aspiring programmers could write BASIC language programs that would impress their friends. The Sorcerer design was eloquent with the highest resolution in the marketplace and innovative because the graphic characters could be reprogrammed to represent any kind of 8x8 character the programmer wanted and was not fixed like the graphic characters on the Commodore PET. Howell did such a good job in this area of the design that it was to achieve a “Most Innovative” award at the Consumer Electronics Show after its introduction.
 The fastest microcomputer chip with the most software compatibility in the marketplace. The Exidy Sorcerer used the Z80 Processor from Zilog Corp. (the same as the TRS-80 from Tandy, while the Apple II and Commodore PET used the 6502 processor from MOS Technology) which allowed it to run the same BASIC language software that was becoming one of the first standards in the personal computer industry, Microsoft BASIC. Exidy was one of the first companies to license software from Microsoft after they parted ways from MITS, Inc. and before they moved from New Mexico to Seattle.
 Plug-In software cartridges so the computer user could immediately begin using the computer at power-on. The user would not have to load a program from tape or disk to start operating the computer. Exidy would provide three program cartridges under license: Microsoft 8K BASIC, Word Processor Cartridge (which was the “Killer App“ for PCs at the time), and an Assembler Cartridge (for programmers to write their own custom software for proprietary applications). Blank cartridges were provided for custom applications and the most popular application was customer generated foreign language character sets, which made the Exidy Sorcerer the most popular international PC .
 An expansion unit designed to the industry standard S-100 bus so that all of the low cost peripheral products then currently available could be attached to configure a computer system.

Launch in the US 
The Sorcerer made its debut at the Long Beach Computer Show in April 1978. The standard plug-in attachments to the keyboard case (included in the base price of the unit) were a printer port for hard copy devices, cassette port for mass storage, and serial port for communications. Some of these were included with the competing products and some were add-on.

The Exidy Sorcerer was competitively priced at $895 and went to market in Long Beach California in April 1978 and generated a 4,000 unit back-log on introduction. Shipments did not start until later that summer.

Exidy sold the rights to the design of the Exidy Sorcerer to Dynasty Computer Corp. of Dallas, Texas. They made minor updates and re-released it as the "Dynasty smart-ALEC".

Successes outside the US 
Export of personal computers was complicated by the requirement of US Government State Department approval but this was more than offset by the financial advantage afforded by the customary export terms of sale under letter of credit, yielding immediate cash, as compared to chasing payments from domestic retailers on 30-day credit terms. Exidy was thus keen to concentrate on international sales though recognizing the importance of its US presence for development and marketing purposes.

Exidy took this to another level by licensing production both domestically and internationally, increasing total production and market penetration without calling on cash flow. With its unique programmable character set for foreign language characters, the Exidy Sorcerer was in a league of its own. Advance royalty payments and license fees made this business a priority for Exidy, Inc.

The first Sorcerers sold in the UK were imported direct from the US by a small company based in Cornwall called Liveport Ltd. Liveport also eventually designed and built extra plug-in ROM-PAC cartridges and an add-on floppy disk drive (based on Micropolis units) that did not require the expensive S-100 chassis. Sorcerer sales in continental Europe were fairly strong, via their distributor, Compudata Systems. The machine had its greatest success in 1979 when the Dutch broadcasting company TELEAC, in a move to be emulated later by the BBC with its BBC Micro, decided to introduce its own home computer. The Belgian company DAI was originally contracted to design the machine but they failed to deliver and Compudata delivered several thousand Sorcerers instead.

Sales in Europe were strong and, when the Dutch Government endorsed computers for small business, Compudata decided to license the Exidy design for local construction in the Netherlands with government support. After several years of Exidy production, Compudata developed their own 16-bit Intel 8088–based machine called the Tulip, replacing the Sorcerer in 1983. One of the largest computing user groups in the Netherlands was the ESGG (Exidy Sorcerer Gebruikers Groep) which published a monthly newsletter in two editions, Dutch and English. For some time, they were the largest group in the HCC (Hobby Computer Club) federation. The Dutch company De Broeders Montfort was a major firmware manufacturer.

The Sorcerer was successful in Australia as a result of strong promotion by its exclusive agent Dick Smith Electronics, though there was price resistance as it was considered beyond the means of most hobbyists. The Sorcerer Computer Users group of Australia (SCUA) actively supported the Sorcerer long after Exidy discontinued it, with RAM upgrades, speed boosts, the "80-column card", and even a replacement monitor program, SCUAMON.

The history of the Sorcerer has some parallels with Exidy's competitor Bally's attempts to build a home computer based on the Astrocade. In contrast to the Astrocade's (and Datamax UV-1's) limited text capabilities but excellent graphics, the Sorcerer had excellent text and only limited graphics.

Description 

The Sorcerer was a combination of parts from a standard S-100 bus machine and its custom display circuitry. The machine included the Zilog Z80 and various bus features needed to run the CP/M operating system, but placed them inside a "closed" box with a built-in keyboard similar to machines like the Commodore PET, the Commodore 64, and the Atari 8-bit family. The Sorcerer's keyboard was a high quality unit with full "throw". The keyboard included a custom "Graphics" key, which allowed easy entry of the extended character set, without having to overwork the Control key, the more common solution on other machines. Leading its peers, the Sorcerer included lower-case characters as a standard feature.

Unlike most S-100 CP/M machines of its era, the Sorcerer did not have any internal expansion slots, and everything that was needed for basic computing was built-in. A standard video monitor was required for display, and optionally a standard audio cassette deck was needed for data storage. The Sorcerer included a small ROM containing a simple monitor program which allowed the machine to be controlled at the machine language level, as well as load programs from cassette tape or cartridges. The cartridges, known as "ROM PAC"s in Exidy-speak, were built by replacing the internal tape in an eight-track tape cartridge with a circuit board and edge connector to interface with the Sorcerer.

The machine was usable without any expansion, but if the user wished to use S-100 cards they could do so with an external expansion chassis. This was connected to the back of the machine through a 50-pin connector. Using the expansion chassis the user could directly support floppy disks, and boot from them into CP/M (without which the disks were not operable). Another expansion option was a large external cage which included a full set of S-100 slots, allowing the Sorcerer to be used like a "full" S-100 machine. Still another option combined the floppies, expansion chassis and a small monitor into a single box.

Graphics  
Graphics on the Sorcerer sound impressive, with a resolution of 512×240, when most machines of the era supported a maximum of 320×200. These lower resolutions were a side effect of the inability of the video hardware to read the screen data from RAM fast enough; given the slow speed of the machines they would end up spending all of their time driving the display. The key to building a usable system was to reduce the total amount of data, either by reducing the resolution, or by reducing the number of colors.

The Sorcerer instead chose another method entirely, which was to use definable character graphics. There were 256 characters possible for each screen location. The lower half was fixed in ROM, and contained the usual ASCII character set. The upper half was defined in RAM. This area would be loaded with a default set of graphics at reset, but could be re-defined and used in lieu of pixel-addressable graphics. In fact the machine was actually drawing a 64×30 display (8×8 characters) which was well within the capabilities of the hardware. However this meant that all graphics had to lie within a checkerboard pattern on the screen, and the system was generally less flexible than machines with "real" graphics. In addition, the high resolution was well beyond the capability of the average color TV, a problem they solved by not supporting color. In this respect the Sorcerer was similar to the PET and TRS-80 in that it had only "graphics characters" to draw with, but at least on the Sorcerer one could define a custom set. It was also possible to provide animation by character replacement or by redefining the character bitmap.

Given these limitations, the quality of the graphics on the Sorcerer was otherwise excellent. Clever use of several characters for each graphic allowed programmers to create smooth motion on the screen, regardless of the character-cell boundaries. A more surprising limitation, given the machine's genesis, is the lack of sound output. Enterprising developers then standardized on use of two pins of the parallel port, to which users were expected to attach a speaker.

Software 
A Standard BASIC cartridge was included with the machine. This cartridge was essentially the common Microsoft BASIC already widely used in the CP/M world. One modification was the addition of single-stroke replacements for common BASIC commands, pressing  would insert the word PRINT for instance, allowing for higher-speed entry. The machine included sound in/out ports on the back that could be attached to a cassette tape recorder, so BASIC could load and save programs to tape without needing a disk drive. An Extended BASIC cartridge requiring 16 KB was also advertised, but it is unclear if this was actually available; Extended BASIC from Microsoft was available on cassette. Another popular cartridge was the Word Processor PAC which contained a version of the early word processor program Spellbinder. A constant ROM fault in the wordprocessor PAC was a printer status switch setting for the printer, but most people learned about it and turned it off early in their power-on.

The Montfort Brothers made an EPROM PAC with a rechargeable battery inside and 16 KB RAM with an external write-protect switch. Thus bootable software could be uploaded to the pack and kept for a longer period.

RAM expansion 
Many CP/M machines were designed to allow the full 16-bit address space of 64 KB to be populated by memory. This was problematic on the Exidy Sorcerer. 32 KB could easily be populated. Another 16 KB was the ROM cartridge address space. This could be populated, but required disabling the ROM cartridge capability. The last 16 KB was required by the system for I/O, particularly for the video, and would have required extensive system modification.

References

External links 

 Trailing Edge's Exidy Sorcerer Pages
 Obsolete Technology website
 Evil Exidy's Sorcerer Page
 Exidy Sorcer Emulator (requires Java)
 Satellite tracking BASIC code for Scorcerer SATTRAK by Dcooke and WBarker 1979
 Digibarn Systems: Exidy Sorcerer
 Exidy Sorcerer at Vintage Computers 
 Exidy Sorcerer at computer-museum.nl
 OLD-COMPUTERS.COM's Exidy Sorcerer pages
 Exidy Sorcerer in Terry Stewart's collection

Z80-based home computers
Home computers
S-100 machines